KLKX-LP (98.5 FM) is a radio station licensed to Alexandria, Minnesota, United States.  The station is currently owned by Alexandria Community Radio Educational Organization, Inc.

References

External links
 

Radio stations in Minnesota
Low-power FM radio stations in Minnesota
Radio stations established in 2015
2015 establishments in Minnesota